Roman Valley is a community in the Canadian province of Nova Scotia, located in  Guysborough County .

References
 Roman Valley on Destination Nova Scotia

Communities in Guysborough County, Nova Scotia
General Service Areas in Nova Scotia